The Legislative Assembly of Irkutsk Oblast is the regional parliament of Irkutsk Oblast, a federal subject of Russia. A total of 45 deputies are elected for five-year terms.

Elections

2018

References

Irkutsk Oblast
Politics of Irkutsk Oblast